Justice courts are courts of law in Oregon with jurisdiction within their county with the circuit court in criminal prosecutions except felony trials. They are held by a justice of the peace. These courts are outside the state-funded court system. Their jurisdiction is limited to traffic, boating, wildlife and other minor violations, but they may handle city ordinance violations if an agreement exists with a city. Justice courts do not have jurisdiction over certain types of civil cases, including disputes over title to real estate, false imprisonment, libel, slander and malicious prosecution.

Justice courts were established in Oregon when the region was governed by the Oregon Provisional Government prior to the creation of the Oregon Territory in 1848, with the first justice of the peace chosen in 1847. When Oregon became a state in 1859, justice courts continued in every county. In the second half of the twentieth century, justice courts declined, but the circuit courts were not able to handle the volume of cases as quickly as the justice courts.

, thirty justice courts operated in twenty counties, conducted using the mode of proceeding and rules of evidence similar to those used in the circuit courts. The court district boundaries were established and authorized by boards of county commissioners.

Notes

External links 
Justice Courts - Oregon Blue Book

Oregon state courts
1847 establishments in the United States
Courts and tribunals established in 1847